Lamoria pachylepidella is a species of snout moth in the genus Lamoria. It was described by Ragonot in 1901. It is found in Australia, including Queensland.

References

Moths described in 1901
Tirathabini